Club Olimpo, usually referred to as Olimpo de Bahía Blanca, is an Argentine sports club based in the city of Bahía Blanca, Buenos Aires Province. The club was founded October 15th, 1910. Its primary activity is soccer. The club is recognized in Argentina's highest soccer league. In basketball the club participated in the Torneo Nacional de Ascenso until the 2016/2017 season, stopping due to economic problems. Olimpo is considered one of the most recognized and important institutions in southern Argentina due to the history, championships won, infrastructure, large number of sports, representation of the city of Bahía Blanca, and for its fan base.

Throughout the history of the club, their basketball team has stood out. Olimpo won the Campeonato Argentino de Clubes twice, 1974 and 1978. Until 1984, Club Olimpo participated in the highest category for argentine basketball and participated in a sub-tournament of the Liga Nacional in 1986. Club Olimpo´s basketball is recognized for being the only sports club from Bahía Blanca to reach a national title on the world scale. Olimpo has won 19 championships in the first division of the Asociación Bahiense de Básquetbol, making them the team which has won the most championships. Since July 3, 1971, Olimpo plays its games in their home stadium, Estadio Norberto Tomas, which has a capacity of 2,500 people.

Soccer has always been the main activity of the club. Olimpo records the most wins in La Liga del Sur history with 28 championships. This is the oldest and most important regional tournament in Argentina. Olimpo has also won the championship in the second division three times (2001/2, 2006/7, and 2009/10), making them the club with the most wins in the competition, along with Banfield.

History
The club is based in Bahía Blanca, having been founded in 1910.

In 1982 Olimpo had the national record of highest attendance  in a cup match from a 2nd Tier club of 87,538 when they played in the Torneo Regional, where they lost in the Group 1 play-off to Mariano Moreno.

The team were relegated from the first division in the 2005–06 season, losing a play-off against Belgrano.

After winning the Apertura and Clausura of the Primera B Nacional in 2006–07 season, Olimpo returned to the Primera División. However, the team would be relegated during its first season back in the division, the 2007–08 season.

After two seasons back in the Primera B Nacional, Olimpo won promotion for the third time to play the 2010–11 season in the Argentine topflight.

Players

Current squad
.

Out on loan

Notable former players

Honours

Primera B Nacional: 2009–10

References

External links

 
Olimpo de Bahía Blanca page at ESPN

 
Bahía Blanca
Association football clubs established in 1910
Basketball teams in Buenos Aires Province
1910 establishments in Argentina
Football clubs in Buenos Aires Province